Ronger Manush is a Bangladeshi drama television series that aired on NTV in 2004. It was the directorial debut of Salauddin Lavlu. The spin-off series Kemon Ache Ronger Manushera was made in 2014, and premiered on Eid. It was shot in Pubail, and is set in a village where everyone lives peacefully.

Cast
 ATM Shamsuzzaman as Bostani Shah
 Salauddin Lavlu as Badan Shah
 Wahida Mollick Jolly as Hamela
 Tania Ahmed as Manjela
 Ahmed Rubel as Shaharali
 Fazlur Rahman Babu as Pocketmar
 Bonna Mirza as Ranga
 Rumana
 Rahmat Ali as Panju Khan
 AKM Hasan as Rakhal
 Pran Ray as Dublo

References

2004 Bangladeshi television series debuts
2000s Bangladeshi television series
Bangladeshi drama television series
Bengali-language television programming in Bangladesh
NTV (Bangladeshi TV channel) original programming